Tobaku Datenroku Kaiji is the third part of the manga series Kaiji by Nobuyuki Fukumoto. It ran in Kodansha's seinen manga magazine Weekly Young Magazine from 2004 to 2008. Kodansha collected its chapters in thirteen tankōbon volumes, released from November 5, 2004, to April 4, 2008. It was followed by the fourth part, Tobaku Datenroku Kaiji: Kazuya-hen.


Volume list

Omnibus edition

References

Kaiji manga chapter lists